Events from the year 1530 in Sweden

Incumbents
 Monarch – Gustav I

Events

 - Olaus Magnus is deposed from all offices in Sweden and his goods are confiscated by the crown. 
 - En liten postilla by Olaus Petri

Births

 - Laurentius Petri Gothus, second Lutheran archbishop  (died 1579) 
 - Jöran Persson, royal favorite and adviser  (died 1568) 
 - Klaus Fleming, admiral and governor  (died 1597) 
 - Clas Åkesson Tott, privy Councillor  (died 1590)

Deaths

 - Eric Trolle, regent  (born 1460)

References

External links

 
Years of the 16th century in Sweden
Sweden